Range Line is an unincorporated community in Eagle Creek Township, Lake County, Indiana.

Geography

References

Unincorporated communities in Lake County, Indiana
Unincorporated communities in Indiana